The 1990 Louisville Cardinals football team represented the University of Louisville in the 1990 NCAA Division I-A football season. The team played their home games in Cardinal Stadium and were Fiesta Bowl champions.

Schedule

Roster

Rankings

Schedule and results

at San Jose State

Kansas

at Southern Miss

Memphis State

at Cincinnati

Boston College

vs. Alabama (Fiesta Bowl)

Browning Nagle threw for a Fiesta Bowl record 451 yards and 3 touchdowns as the Cardinals routed the Crimson Tide, 34–7.

1991 NFL Draft

References

Louisville
Louisville Cardinals football seasons
Fiesta Bowl champion seasons
Louisville Cardinals football